Gwimokbong  is a mountain in Gapyeong County, Gyeonggi-do in South Korea. It rests between the peaks of Cheonggyesan and Myeongjisan.

See also
 List of mountains in Korea

Notes

References
 

Mountains of South Korea
Mountains of Gyeonggi Province
One-thousanders of South Korea